Ayam Pelung or Pelung Chicken (Pelung long crower) is a poultry breed from Cianjur, Indonesia. The males (roosters) are considered to be "singing chickens", with contests being frequent in the Pelung area for the most melodious crowing.

According to  local myth, in 1850 H. Djarkasih (Mamak Acih), who was a local chicken hobbyist, religious teacher, and farmer in Bunikasih Village, Cianjur, Indonesia, found a young male chick in his garden and raised it. It matured quickly and uttered a long and melodious crow. Mamah Acih called it Ayam Pelung.

Features

Great Size and Posture 

The Ayam Pelung is known for its large size and straight posture. A full-grown cock will reach 11-13 lbs and a hen 8 lbs. Their large size and quick growth rate makes them good broiler chickens.

Rapid Growth and Weight Gain 

The Ayam Pelung grows very quickly compared with most other domestic poultry breeds..

Exceptional Crow 

The Ayam Pelung is also known for its long, melodious crow.

References 

Chicken breeds originating in Indonesia
Chicken breeds
Cianjur Regency